Pretty Little Liars is an American mystery teen drama television series based on the novel series of the same name written by Sara Shepard. Developed by I. Marlene King, the series was broadcast on Freeform between June 8, 2010, and June 27, 2017, comprising 160 episodes over seven seasons. Set in the fictional Rosewood, Pennsylvania, the plot follows five best friends whose secrets are consistently threatened by the anonymous "A", who begins harassing them after the disappearance of their clique leader. Troian Bellisario, Ashley Benson, Lucy Hale, Shay Mitchell, Sasha Pieterse and Janel Parrish lead the ensemble cast, alongside Holly Marie Combs, Ian Harding, Bianca Lawson, Laura Leighton, Chad Lowe, Nia Peeples, Tyler Blackburn and Andrea Parker.

Pretty Little Liars started a media franchise with a web series titled Pretty Dirty Secrets and two spin-offs, Ravenswood and Pretty Little Liars: The Perfectionists, both of which were cancelled after one season. A fourth series titled Pretty Little Liars: Original Sin premiered on HBO Max in 2022, which focus on a new cast of characters in a different setting.

Premise 
Aria Montgomery, Emily Fields, Hanna Marin and Spencer Hastings are four former best friends who reunite one year after the disappearance of their clique leader, Alison DiLaurentis, and begin receiving threatening messages from a mysterious person who identifies themself as "A" and is aware of the mistakes, lies and secrets they have collected before and after their clique fell apart. Throughout the series' course, several elements from the night Alison disappeared are revealed, which help the protagonists understand what happened to their friend and how "A" came up. Moving forward, after the original "A" is revealed, the identity is taken over by other antagonists, prompting new storylines and challenges.

Episodes

Cast and characters 

 Troian Bellisario as Spencer Hastings and Alex Drake (season 7)
 Ashley Benson as Hanna Marin
 Holly Marie Combs as Ella Montgomery (seasons 1–3; recurring, seasons 4–6; guest, season 7)
 Lucy Hale as Aria Montgomery
 Ian Harding as Ezra Fitz
 Bianca Lawson as Maya St. Germain (seasons 1–2; recurring, season 3)
 Laura Leighton as Ashley Marin
 Chad Lowe as Byron Montgomery (seasons 1–3; recurring, seasons 4 and 6; guest, seasons 5 and 7)
 Shay Mitchell as Emily Fields
 Nia Peeples as Pam Fields (season 1; recurring, seasons 2–4 and 6; guest, seasons 5 and 7)
 Sasha Pieterse as Alison DiLaurentis
 Tyler Blackburn as Caleb Rivers (seasons 3–7; recurring, seasons 1–2)
 Janel Parrish as Mona Vanderwaal (seasons 3–7; recurring, seasons 1–2)
 Andrea Parker as Mary Drake (season 7; guest, seasons 4 and 6) and Jessica DiLaurentis (guest, season 2; recurring, seasons 4–6)

Production

Development 

The Pretty Little Liars series of novels was first published in October 2006 and comprises 18 books, divided into four arcs and companion stories. The project was given to author Sara Shepard by book packaging company Alloy Entertainment following the conception of the idea of a "Desperate Housewives for teens". Shepard was chosen due to her having grown up in a town similar to the fictional Rosewood, where the series take place, and her online presence. The television adaptation was first planned for The WB until the network shut down in 2006. A pilot for ABC Family was announced in June 2008, with I. Marlene King serving as the series' developer and showrunner. The viewership success of the first 10 episodes prompted ABC Family to order 12 additional episodes, finishing the first season with 22 installments. It also led Alloy Entertainment to extend the novel series beyond its original foreseen count of eight books.

A second season was unveiled by ABC Family on January 10, 2011. In June, the network announced that its 13 Nights of Halloween lineup would include a Halloween-themed Pretty Little Liars flashback episode, bringing the second-season episode count from 24 to 25. In December of that year, it was announced that the identity of "A" would be revealed in the second season's finale, which took place on March 19, 2012. The series' third season was confirmed in November 2011 and broadcast between June 5, 2012 and March 19, 2013, consisting of 24 episodes.

The series was renewed for a fourth season in October 2012. It was broadcast between June 11, 2013, and March 18, 2014. The fifth season was commissioned in March 2013, alongside the announcement of the spin-off series Ravenswood, and consisted of 25 episodes, including a Christmas-themed one. The special episode aired as part of the network's 25 Days of Christmas annual event. The season also included the series' 100th episode, which was celebrated by cast and crew in a private party on June 2, 2015. Before the season premiered, ABC Family renewed the series for two additional seasons of 20 episodes each, making it the network's longest running original series.

The sixth season was broadcast between June 2, 2015, and March 15, 2016. It did not include a holiday-themed episode and introduced a new opening sequence for the series. The seventh and final season was broadcast between June 21, 2016, and June 27, 2017. It marked the return of Charlie Craig, who worked on the second season, as executive producer and co-showrunner. The series' ending was confirmed by I. Marlene King and the main cast in August 2016, with the series finale being a two-hour event followed by a tell-all special with cast and crew.

Casting 

Casting for Pretty Little Liars began in October 2009, with Gayle Pillsbury and Bonnie Zane as casting directors. Lucy Hale, Troian Bellisario and Ian Harding were respectively cast as Aria Montgomery, Spencer Hastings and Ezra Fitz in November. The following month, the cast added Ashley Benson as Hanna Marin, Shay Mitchell as Emily Fields, Laura Leighton as Ashley Marin, Nia Peeples as Pam Fields, Roark Critchlow as Tom Marin, Bianca Lawson as Maya, Alexis Denisof as Byron Montgomery and Jean Louisa Kelly as a mother, with Torrey DeVitto and Sasha Pieterse in undisclosed recurring roles. Mitchell originally auditioned for the role of Spencer, but was suggested by the production crew to try Emily out, to whom she felt more connected. Louisa Kelly's appearance in the series did not materialize. In January 2010, Alloy Entertainment's website confirmed that Pieterse would portray Alison DiLaurentis and DeVitto would portray Melissa Hastings, and announced the casting of Janel Parrish as Mona Vanderwaal and Igor Hudacek as Mike Montgomery; Cody Christian later replaced Hudacek. In April, Chad Lowe replaced Denisof in the role of Byron, while Holly Marie Combs joined the cast as Aria's mother, Ella.

Two actors were replaced following the pilot episode: Keegan Allen replaced James Neate as Toby Cavanaugh and Ryan Merriman replaced Carlo Marks as Ian Thomas. After the first season was broadcast, three other roles received new actors: Andrea Parker took over Jessica DiLaurentis from Anne Marie DeLuise, Drew Van Acker took over Jason DiLaurentis from Parker Bagley, and Natalie Hall took over Kate Randall from Natalie Floyd. Parker's casting for the second season was announced in April 2011. That month, Annabeth Gish joined the cast as Anne Sullivan, a therapist hired by the girls' parents to help them. Also during the second season, Lawson had a minor starring role, being only credited in the episodes she appeared in. For the third season, Tyler Blackburn and Parrish were promoted to the series' starring cast following their recurring appearances. Blackburn left the cast in the fourteenth episode of the fourth season to star in Ravenswood and returned in the fifth episode of the fifth season.

Filming 
The series' pilot was filmed in Vancouver in December 2009. Filming for the series moved to Los Angeles from the second episode onward. The Warner Bros. studio and backlot in Burbank, near Los Angeles, were also used. Filming for the second season wrapped on December 16, 2011. In June 2012, the series was among projects selected for a California tax credit. Filming for the fourth season wrapped on November 2, 2013. The fifth season was filmed between March 24 and November 20, 2014. Filming for the sixth season began on March 24, 2015. Production for the seventh season commenced on February 1, 2016, while filming took place between March and October 2016.

Music 
Michael Suby worked as the series' score composer since its inception. American duo The Pierces' 2007 song "Secret" was used as the series' opening theme, which was suggested by Ashley Benson. WaterTower Music released a soundtrack album titled Pretty Little Liars: Television Soundtrack on February 15, 2011; the release features songs by The Fray, Ben's Brother, MoZella, Katie Herzig and Colbie Caillat, among others.

To promote the series' third and fifth seasons respectively, American singer ZZ Ward released Pretty Little Liars-themed music videos for her songs "Til the Casket Drops" and "Last Love Song", included on debut studio album, Til the Casket Drops (2012).

Release

Broadcast
Pretty Little Liars premiered on June 8, 2010, in the United States, becoming ABC Family's highest-rated series debut on record across the network's target demographics. It ranked number one in key 12–34 demos and teens, becoming the number-one scripted show in Women 18–34, and Women 18–49. The premiere was number two in the hour for total viewers, which generated 2.47 million unique viewers, and was ABC Family's best delivery in the time slot since the premiere of The Secret Life of the American Teenager.

The second episode retained 100% of its premiere audience with 2.48 million viewers, despite the usual downward trend following a premiere of a show, and built on its premiere audience. It was the dominant number one of its time slot in Adults 18–49, and the number one show in female teens. Subsequent episodes fluctuated between 2.09 and 2.74 million viewers. The August 10, 2010, "Summer Finale" episode drew an impressive 3.07 million viewers.

On June 28, 2010, ABC Family ordered 12 more episodes of the show, bringing its total first-season order to 22. On January 10, 2011, ABC Family picked the show up for a second season that premiered on June 14, 2011. During the summer of 2011, Pretty Little Liars was basic cable's top scripted series in women aged 18–34 and viewers 12–34. The second half of season 2 aired on Mondays at 8/7c, beginning on January 2, 2012.

On November 29, 2011, ABC Family renewed the show for a third season, which consisted of 24 episodes. On October 4, 2012, ABC Family announced that the show was renewed for a fourth season, again comprising 24 episodes. The second half of the third season began airing on January 8, 2013, and finished on March 19, 2013. Pretty Little Liars returned for Season 4 on June 11, 2013. On March 26, 2013, it was again announced that Pretty Little Liars had been renewed for a fifth season scheduled for a 2014 air date and a new spin off show entitled Ravenswood would begin airing after the season four annual Halloween special in October 2013. The second half of season four premiered on January 7, 2014. It was announced on June 10, 2014, that Pretty Little Liars was renewed for two seasons, making the show ABC Family's longest running original hit series. On August 29, 2016, I. Marlene King announced that Pretty Little Liars would be ending after the seventh season had aired. The second half of the seventh season began airing in April compared to January in the previous season.

Marketing
Pretty Little Liars was called one of the most spectacular new shows of summer 2010 thanks to heavy promotion by ABC Family, including "spicy promos and hot posters". ABC Family encouraged fans to host a "Pretty Little Premiere Party" for the show by sending the first respondents a fan kit, and selected applicants to become part of an interactive "Secret Keeper Game" played with iPhones provided by the network. The show's official Facebook and Twitter accounts also promoted special fan features, including a "Pretty Little Lie Detector". Los Angeles department store Kitson showcased the show in their shop window.

A tie-in edition featuring the Season 1 poster and logo of the 2006 first novel in the Pretty Little Liars series was released on the date of the show's premiere, as was the final book of the original book series, "Wanted". "Wanted" later decidedly became the eighth book of the series, as Shepard later confirmed she would extend the series. A TV tie-in of the second book "Flawless" featuring an altered Season 3 poster was released on December 28, 2012. Another book titled The Amateurs (2016), was written by Shepard is appeared in a local book store scene from the seventh season episode "The Talented Mr. Rollins", was aired on July 5, 2016.

Reception

Critical response

Pretty Little Liars opened with mixed reviews. Metacritic gave the pilot episode 54 out of 100, based upon 14 critical reviews. The New York Daily News gave the show a positive review, commenting that it "makes most popular vampire romances look anemic", while concluding, "Pretty Little Liars could go in several directions, including mundane teen clichés. It's got an equally good shot at making us care about these imperfect pretty girls." A writer on Terror Hook has stated that " 'Pretty Little Liars' gets off to a very promising start. Great production all around, the writing keeps the viewer on their toes, and the acting just reinforces it. The overall mystery of the show in the end is dark and unpredictable, even stepping into the slasher film realm." The New York Post gave the show three out of five stars, stating, "OK, so we've established that there is no socially redeeming value in this series and that your kids shouldn't watch it if they are too young and impressionable. But if you can distract them enough to miss the first 15 minutes, the show isn't half-bad. Actually, it is half-good, if that makes sense." The Los Angeles Times wrote that the series is "one of those shows that manages to mildly, and perhaps unintentionally, spoof its genre while fully participating in it, and that's not a bad thing at all."

Entertainment Weekly had a less favorable review, giving the show a letter grade of "D−", saying, "Imagine the pitch for Liars: It's I Know What You Did Last Summer meets Gossip Girl, but like not so subtle." It went on to say that the plot "hits every racy teen entertainment mark so hard (everyone's hair is so full—of secrets!) that it feels like the only thing missing is a visit from the ghosts of Jennifer Love Hewitt and Freddie Prinze, Jr." The Hollywood Reporter compared the show to those on The CW and noted, "Sure, there's a lot here that sustains more eye-rolling than interested stares, but a little patience might be warranted."

Subsequent seasons attracted positive reception, with the third and fourth seasons in particular receiving critical acclaim. The series has received criticism for its plot lines, which are often cited as overly complicated and full of plot holes. The identity of the final "A" has received harsh criticism from critics and fans, who found the reveal disappointing and nonsensical.

The performances have also received positive reviews. In particular, Bellisario and Parrish (who play Spencer and Mona, respectively) have received widespread critical and popular acclaim, while the performances of Benson, Hale, and Pieterse (who play Hannah, Aria, and Alison, respectively) have also been lauded.

Ratings
Since the series premiere, Pretty Little Liars has remained popular. In 2016, a New York Times study of the 50 TV shows with the most Facebook Likes found that the show's "popularity is tilted toward women more than any other show in the data — over 94 percent of 'likes' come from women".

The series earned its highest rated episode with 4.20 million total viewers, ranking among ABC Family's top 5 telecasts in adult viewers 18–34, total viewers and women viewers. The highest rated episodes include season one's finale, with 3.64 million, and season two's premiere and finale episodes, each yielding nearly 3.7 million viewers. The show stands as the most watched series on ABC Family, maintaining a steady viewership of over 2.5 million and currently standing as the only show to yield an average of over 2 million viewers.

Accolades

In other media

Spin-offs

Ravenswood

Ravenswood is a supernatural teen drama mystery-thriller series. Set in the fictional town of Ravenswood, Pennsylvania, the series follows five strangers whose lives become intertwined by a deadly curse that has plagued their town for generations. They have to dig into the town's dark past to solve the mysterious curse. It stars Nicole Gale Anderson, Tyler Blackburn, Steven Cabral, Brett Dier, Britne Oldford and Merritt Patterson.

Pretty Little Liars: The Perfectionists

Pretty Little Liars: The Perfectionists is a crime thriller mystery drama series, based on the novel The Perfectionists by Sara Shepard, which serves as a sequel to the original series. In a town of Beacon Heights, Washington, where everything seems perfect, from their top-tier college to their overachieving residents and the stress of needing to be perfect leads to the town's first murder. Sasha Pieterse and Janel Parrish returned for their roles as Alison DiLaurentis and Mona Vanderwaal, respectively. The series also stars Sofia Carson, Sydney Park, Eli Brown, Hayley Erin, Graeme Thomas King and Kelly Rutherford.

Pretty Little Liars: Original Sin

On September 2, 2020, it was announced that a new series is in development at Warner Bros., with Riverdale creator Roberto Aguirre-Sacasa taking over as showrunner from I. Marlene King. Although called the series a "reboot", but was later confirmed to be taking place within the existing universe of the franchise and will introduce new characters and storylines. The series was set in a new town where the main characters will pay for their parents' sin nearly 20 years ago. On September 24, 2020, HBO Max gave the spin-off series order and was named Pretty Little Liars: Original Sin, as Aguirre-Sacasa teamup with Lindsay Calhoon Bring to create the series. The series will consist of 10 episodes. In July 2021, Chandler Kinney, Maia Reficco, and Bailee Madison were cast in lead roles, joined by Zaria and Malia Pyles the following month.

Web series

Pretty Dirty Secrets

Pretty Dirty Secrets is a web series, which taking place between the events of the third-season episodes "The Lady Killer" and "This Is a Dark Ride". Set in the Rosewood Halloween Spooktacular Store, as the visitors of Rosewood prepared for Halloween.

Reunion
On May 15, 2020, through a Looped app, TV Guide author Damian Holbrook aired a virtual cast reunion for the series' 10th anniversary and a charity fundraising effort during the COVID-19 pandemic, with the Pretty Little Liars reunion supporting Feeding America. All of the original cast participated, with the event dedicated to those who were affected with the pandemic. In addition to the cast, Ian Harding and Tyler Blackburn and the series' creator I. Marlene King were also present. A second virtual reunion premiered on May 29, 2020, as a part of Wizard World Virtual Experiences, hosted by Mike Gregorek. This edition which includes more cast members from the series including appearances by Pieterse and Parrish. As they discuss behind the scenes moments of the series.

International adaptation

Turkish version 

In 2015, a Turkish adaptation of the series was broadcast on Star TV. Titled Tatlı Küçük Yalancılar (Sweet Little Liars), it was produced by Warner Bros International Television Production.

Indonesian version 

Pretty Little Liars is an Indonesian drama mystery streaming television series produced by Warner Bros International Television Production in collaboration with Asian streaming service Viu. Serving as an adaption of the original series of the same name, it stars Yuki Kato, Anya Geraldine, Eyka Farhana/Caitlin Halderman, Valerie Thomas, and Shindy Huang as college students whose clique once falls apart after their leader goes mysteriously missing the night of their high school graduation in the fictional town of Amerta, Bali. The series premiered on April 22, 2020, with 10 episodes on 17 countries in Asia and Africa.

Cancelled Philippine version 
A Philippine adaptation of the series was reported from TV5 was set to be released in 2014. However, the network later announced the series was shelved indefinitely.

Other adaptations 
In 2012, Channel V India launched Best Friends Forever?, a non-official version of Pretty Little Liars. The show ran for a total of 140 episodes An Indonesian version was broadcast on Trans TV in 2017.

References

Notes

Citations

External links

 
 
 

 
2010 American television series debuts
2010s American crime drama television series
2010s American high school television series
2010s American LGBT-related drama television series
2010s American mystery television series
2010s American teen drama television series
2017 American television series endings
ABC Family original programming
American thriller television series
Crime thriller television series
English-language television shows
Freeform (TV channel) original programming
Lesbian-related television shows
Nonlinear narrative television series
Serial drama television series
Television shows based on American novels
Television series about teenagers
Television series by Alloy Entertainment
Television series by Warner Bros. Television Studios
Television series by Warner Horizon Television
Television shows filmed in Vancouver
Television shows filmed in Los Angeles
Television series set in the 2000s
Television series set in the 2010s
Television shows set in Pennsylvania
Works about stalking
Television series about revenge
Television series about bullying